Jonathan Betts MBE (born January 1955) is Curator Emeritus at the Royal Observatory (National Maritime Museum), Greenwich, a horological scholar and author, and an expert on the first marine timekeepers created by John Harrison in the middle of the 18th century. He was formerly Senior Specialist in horology at Greenwich. Between 2016 and 2019 he served on the board of trustees of the Institute of Conservation.

Career

From a family of retail watchmakers and jewellers, he took the British Horological Institute finals in technical horology. In 1975 he was awarded the Tremayne National Prize for Practical Watchmaking. For the following five years, he practised as a self-employed horology conservator. In 1980 he was appointed Senior Horology Conservator at the National Maritime Museum, and in 1989 was presented the museum's Callender Award for his contribution to horological conservation. He was appointed Curator of Horology in 1990 and became Senior Specialist in 2001.

He is the biographer of Rupert Gould, the restorer of the Harrison timekeepers.  The biography was published in 2006 by Oxford University Press under the title Time Restored: The Harrison Timekeepers and RT Gould, the Man Who Knew (Almost) Everything.

In 2002 he was awarded the Clockmakers' Company's Harrison Gold Medal and the British Horological Institute's Barrett Medal in 2008, and is a Huntington Fellow at the Mariners' Museum, Newport News, Virginia.  He is a Fellow of the Royal Society of Arts, the Society of Antiquaries, of the British Horological Institute, and of the International Institute of Conservation. He is Vice-Chairman of the Antiquarian Horological Society, and serves as Horological Adviser to the National Trust, as well as Clocks Adviser to the Anglican Diocese of Southwark. He is Curatorial Adviser for the substantial collection of clocks at Belmont House and Gardens in the care of the Harris (Belmont) Charity. He is also Curatorial Adviser to both the Clockmakers' Company and the Wallace Collection.  In 2014 he served as Master of the Clockmakers Company.

He serves on the vetting committee of the annual art fair organised by the British Antique Dealers' Association, and is chairman of the vetting committee of London's Masterpiece Fair.

In 1996, Betts provided the idea and detail for a central element in the plot of Time on Our Hands, an episode from the British TV  comedy Only Fools and Horses. In 2000, he acted as an adviser on Granada's television drama Longitude.

Awards 
 Betts was appointed Member of the Order of the British Empire (MBE) in the 2012 Birthday Honours for services to horology.
In 2012, he received the BQ 'Watch Culture' award in China, from the Beijing-based journal BQ.
 In 2013 he was awarded the Plowden Medal by the Royal Warrant Holder's Association for his contribution to Horology Conservation.
 He received the Prix Gaïa on 17 September 2015 for his achievements in historical research.

Publications 
 National Trust Pocket Guide to Clocks (Octopus, 1985)
 Harrison (National Maritime Museum, 1993, and subsequent editions)
 Clocks and Watches, a Guide to the Belmont collection (Belmont, 1998)
 Time Restored (OUP, 2006)
 Marine Chronometers at Greenwich (OUP, 2017)
 Harrison Decoded: Towards a Perfect Pendulum Clock, edited with Rory McEvoy (OUP, 2020)

Footnotes

References 
Betts (2006): "Time Restored", Oxford University Press, Authors Preface.
Jonathan Betts. National Maritime Museum.

Living people
People from Greenwich
Members of the Order of the British Empire
1955 births